The Ecuadorian sac-winged bat (Balantiopteryx infusca) is a species of sac-winged bat in the family Emballonuridae. It is found in Colombia and Ecuador. According to the IUCN Red List of Threatened Species, the population trend is decreasing for this species, due to habitat destruction through deforestation. In 2013, Bat Conservation International listed this species as one of the 35 species on its worldwide priority list for conservation.

Taxonomy
Balantiopteryx infusca is the sister species of Balantiopteryx io and there are no recognised subspecies.

Appearance
It is larger than Balantiopteryx io, and smaller than Balantiopteryx plicata.  It lacks the white trim of Balantiopteryx plicata, and is darker in color.

Habitat and behavior
It is found in the mouth of caves, abandoned mines, and cracks in rock. It prefers to live where there is plenty of light. The bats are sociable and live in colonies; they are also insectivorous.

References

Balantiopteryx
Bats of South America
Mammals of Colombia
Mammals of Ecuador
Endangered animals
Endangered biota of South America
Mammals described in 1897
Taxonomy articles created by Polbot
Taxa named by Oldfield Thomas